Hellish Outcast is a  death / thrash metal band from Bergen, Norway, founded in 2001.

History 
Hellish Outcast was formed in 2001 in Bergen, Norway, originally as a trio by guitarist Martin Legreid, bassist Mads Mowinckel (Breed) and drummer Mads Lilletvedt (Solstorm, ex Byfrost).

They quickly gained a reputation as one of the most extreme in the underground scene in their city. The band was first introduced as one of the rising stars of the underground, when they appeared on a CD from  Terrorizer Magazine in March 2008. Hellish Outcast debuted with the independent release of the EP Raping - Killing - Murder also in 2008.

In 2010, singer Torbjørn Schei (Thebon, ex-Keep of Kalessin) joined the ranks of Hellish Outcast, who offered the band a sharper sound and a new more aggressive approach to their musical style.

In 2011, the band participated in the European festivals  Devilstone Open Air in Anykščiai, Lithuania on July 15, and Bloodstock Open Air in Walton-on-Trent, England on August 14.

In 2012, Hellish Outcast released their first album, Your God Will Bleed, on April 1, 2012 by themselves. The album was promoted with their first two music videos: "Your God Will Bleed" and "Face Forced Down".

The second album called Stay of Execution, was released under Listenable Records on January 20, 2015 and was recorded in Grieghallen Studios in Bergen and Russell 'Parlour Studios in the UK (Napalm Death, Evile, Dimmu Borgir). The album has a better production, with a sound more elaborate and progressive style. The album was preceded by the music video of the song "Torment".

Members 
Torbjørn Schei (Thebon) - vocals (2010–present)
Mads Mowinckel (Max Morbid) - bass
Mads Lilletvedt (Alkolust) - drums
Martin Legreid - guitars and vocals

Discography 
Their Release from Soil You (Demo) - 2006
Raping - Killing - Murder (EP) - 2008
Your God Will Bleed (Full-length) - 2012
Stay of Execution (Full-length) - 2015

Music videos 
"Face Forced Down" - 2011
"Your God Will Bleed" - 2012
"Djinn" - 2012
"Torment" - 2014

References

External links 
Reverbnation.com
Severbnation.com
YouTube channel
Discogs.com

Musical groups established in 2001
2001 establishments in Norway
Norwegian death metal musical groups
Musical quartets
Musical groups from Bergen
Listenable Records artists